"Temptation" is a 2005 major hit single by Iranian-Swedish singer Arash featuring Rebecca Zadig and taken from Arash' debut album Arash. The music for "Temptation" is from "Baila Maria", a Spanish tune recorded by Ishtar Alabina featuring Los Niños de Sara in 1996. "Temptation" in its own right has been subject of many covers and in a number of languages.

Rebecca Zadig version
"Temptation" was first recorded by Rebecca Zadig with additional lyrics and rendition vocals featuring Alex, the mononym of Alex Arash Labaf who started his career performing under his mononym Alex. The first version, had English as main vocals by Zadig featuring Alex that interpreted some additional Persian language lyrics. The song was launched with a separate music video that was directed and shot by Alec Cartio.

Arash version
"Temptation" was rereleased as a song mainly in Persian language and this time credited Arash as the main vocalist and Rebecca Zadig was reduced to a featuring role with some refrain she sang in English. This release became the definitive version and was Arash's third successful consecutive single after "Boro Boro" (that had reached number 1 in Sweden) and "Tike Tike Kardi" (that had peaked at number 2 in Sweden).

The song credited to Arash made it to number 2 on Sverigetopplistan, the official Swedish Singles Chart, also charting in Germany, Switzerland and Finland. A music video was released with Arash as lead singer.

Charts

Weekly charts

Year-end charts

Accolades

Other versions

Russian version "Vostochniye skazki" with Blestyaschie

In 2005, a Russian language version of the song was made by Arash with the Russian girl group Blestyaschie. The song titled "Vostochniye skazki" (meaning Eastern fairytales) was credited to Blestyaschie featuring Arash. It appeared on Blestyaschie album also titled Vostochniye skazki and released on Partija Russian record label. A separate music video was shot for the single destined for the Russian market.

Charts

Weekly charts

Year-end charts

"Versoeking" by Hi-5

In 2006, the South African cover boy band Hi-5 covered the song in Afrikaans under the title "Versoeking" (meaning temptation in Afrikaans). It was a main single and the title track of the album also titled Versoeking which is the band's follow-up to the Soebat EP (2003) and self-titled Hi-5 (2004).

"Verleid Mij" by Wing-Men
In 2015, the Dutch group Wing-Men covered the song in Dutch under the title "Verleid Mij". It is the debut single from the group.

References

2005 singles
Arash (singer) songs
2005 songs
Warner Music Group singles
Songs written by Robert Uhlmann (composer)
Songs written by Arash (singer)